The BDC Aero Puma is a Canadian ultralight and light-sport aircraft, originally designed by the Italian aircraft designer Antonio Bortolanza and built by Aeroplast of Sale, Piedmont, Italy. It is currently produced by BDC Aero Industrie of Lachute, Quebec. At one time available as a kit for amateur construction, now the aircraft is supplied only as a complete ready-to-fly-aircraft.

Design and development
The aircraft was originally called the Pluto by Bortolanza when he first designed it in the mid-1980s. Later it was known as the Drakken (Swedish for "dragon") before being renamed Puma.

The aircraft was structurally redesigned by BDC Aero Industrie for higher gross weights, to comply with the Canadian Advanced Ultralight rules and US light-sport aircraft rules, in 2006. It features a strut-braced high-wing, a two-seats-in-side-by-side configuration enclosed cockpit with composite doors for access, fixed tricycle landing gear with wheel pants and a single engine in tractor configuration.

The aircraft is made with an aluminum wing and composite fuselage. Standard engines available are the  Rotax 912UL and the  Rotax 912ULS and Rotax 912iS four-stroke powerplants, plus the  Rotax 914 turbocharged engine. Originally there was a factory-supplied kit that was 90% complete and required the builder to paint the airframe and procure and install the engine and instruments. By 2015 the aircraft was only available factory-built.

The Puma is an approved Transport Canada Advanced Ultralight and limited category aircraft, but, as of September 2015, does not appear on the Federal Aviation Administration light-sport aircraft list.

Operational history
In November 2017 there were three advanced ultralight and two limited category BDC-built Pumas registered with Transport Canada, all built by BDC between 2010 and 2016. There was one BDC-built Puma registered in the United States with the Federal Aviation Administration in 2013. In addition Canada had one Bortolanza Puma, built in Italy in 2007, on its register.

Variants

Aeroplast Pluto A-65
Original model, designed by Antonio Bortolanza and produced by Aeroplast in Italy, with a  gross weight for the European microlight category. Powered by a  Rotax 582 or a  Rotax 912UL.
Aeroplast Drakken
Model designed by Antonio Bortolanza in Italy.
Bortolanza Puma
Model designed and built by Antonio Bortolanza in Italy, with a  gross weight for the Canadian advanced ultralight category. At least one built in 2007.
BDC Aero Puma Advanced Ultralight
Redesigned model produced by BDC Aero Industrie in Lachute, Quebec, Canada, with a  gross weight for the Canadian advanced ultralight category. Three built, one in 2010 and two in 2011.
BDC Aero Puma LSA/Limited
Redesigned model produced by BDC Aero Industrie in Lachute, Quebec, Canada, with a  gross weight for the Canadian limited category and the US LSA category. Two built in 2013 and one in 2016.

Specifications (BDC Puma Advanced Ultralight)

References

External links

Photo of an Aeroplast Pluto A-65
Photo of an Aeroplast Pluto A-65

1980s Canadian ultralight aircraft
Homebuilt aircraft
Light-sport aircraft
Single-engined tractor aircraft